Marek Drtina (born June 5, 1989) is a Czech professional ice hockey defenceman. He is currently a free agent.

He played with HC Pardubice in the Czech Extraliga during the 2010–11 Czech Extraliga season. He eventually left the Czech league and joined the France professional league, Ligue Magnus, in 2018.

References

External links
 

1989 births
Czech ice hockey defencemen
HC Dukla Jihlava players
BK Havlíčkův Brod players
HC Dynamo Pardubice players
Les Aigles de Nice players
LHK Jestřábi Prostějov players
Living people
HC Nové Zámky players
Sportspeople from Pardubice
HK 36 Skalica players
HC Slavia Praha players
Stadion Hradec Králové players
Czech expatriate ice hockey players in Slovakia
Czech expatriate sportspeople in France
Expatriate ice hockey players in France